Trinidad de Leon-Roxas (née de Leon y Roura;  October 4, 1900 – June 20, 1995) was the wife of Philippine President Manuel Roxas and the fifth First Lady of the Philippines. They were married in 1921 and had two children, Ruby and Gerardo (Gerry).

A native of San Miguel, Bulacan, De León-Roxas was the daughter of Ceferino De Leon, who was a member of the Malolos Congress. She was also a beauty pageant contestant, having been crowned Carnival Queen (Queen of the Orient) at the Manila Carnival in 1920.

As the country's first lady during the post-war years, De León-Roxas got involved in various charitable organizations such as the White Cross and the Girl Scouts of the Philippines and restored the annual Malacañang Christmas gift-giving begun prior to World War II. The annual gift-giving has become a tradition to this day.

De León-Roxas died on June 20, 1995.

References 

1900 births
1995 deaths
Filipino Roman Catholics
Tagalog people
Filipino beauty pageant winners
People from San Miguel, Bulacan
People from Capiz
First Ladies and First Gentlemen of the Philippines
Trinidad
Burials at the Manila North Cemetery
Spouses of presidents of the Philippines